Solanum demissum is a species of wild potato in the family Solanaceae, native to Mexico and Guatemala. It has been extensively used as a source of alleles for resistance to Phytophthora infestans, the cause of late potato blight, to improve the domestic potato Solanum tuberosum.

References

demissum
Flora of Mexico
Flora of Guatemala
Plants described in 1848